Gopalpur is a census town in Gangarampur CD Block in Gangarampur subdivision of Dakshin Dinajpur district in the state of West Bengal, India.

Geography

Location

In the map alongside, all places marked on the map are linked in the full screen version.

Demographics
As per the 2011 Census of India, Gopalpur had a total population of 7,016, of which 3,883 (51%) were males and 3,433 (49%) were females. Population below 6 years was 615. The total number of literates in Gopalpur was 4,964 (77.55% of the population over 6 years).

Transport
Gopalpur is on Gangarampur-Tapan main road.

References

Cities and towns in Dakshin Dinajpur district